Ashrama may refer to:

Ashram (āśrama), a spiritual hermitage or a monastery in Indian religions
Ashrama (stage) (āśrama), in Hinduism is one of four age-based life stages discussed in ancient and medieval era Indian texts.
Ashrama, California, an unincorporated community in Santa Clara County

See also
Ashram (disambiguation)